Shadbad-e Olya (also Romanized as Shādbād-e ‘Olyā; also known as Shādābād-e Bālā and Shādābād-e ‘Olyā) is a village in Meydan Chay Rural District, in the Central District of Tabriz County, East Azerbaijan Province, Iran. At the 2006 census, its population was 1,884, in 508 families.

References 

Populated places in Tabriz County